Argueta may refer to:

People 
Argueta is a Spanish-language surname. People with the surname include:

 Jorge Argueta, Salvadorian award-winning poet and author
 Luis Argueta (born 1946), Guatemalan film director and producer
 Manlio Argueta (born 1935), Salvadoran writer, critic, and novelist
 Rony Argueta (born 1991), American soccer player
 Sadia Argueta (born 1984), Honduran politician
 Virginia Argueta (born 1994), Guatemalan model and beauty pageant titleholder
 Manuel Colom Argueta (1932–1979), Guatemalan politician and mayor of Guatemala City
  (born 1996), Honduran footballer

  [[Josue Argueta 1997- ) Salvadorian/